Salt River is the name of two streams in the U.S. state of Michigan.

Macomb County
The headwaters rise just west of Richmond  of stream distance to the north. The part of the river by Lake Saint Clair is lined with marinas. Further inland, it soon turns into a large marsh and forested area. Further north, the river runs through light residential areas and farmlands. Most of the river's watershed is rural with suburban lands near the lake. The river is slow flowing and quite swampy in most parts. Some of the named tributaries include:
Fish Creek 
Kirkham Drain
Gibbons Drain
Shook Drain
Fistler Drain

Midland/Isabella counties
The Salt River, also known as the Big Salt River, is a  river that rises in northeastern Isabella County. The main branch is formed by the confluence of the North and South branches in Denver Township at  near the boundary between Isabella and Midland County. The north branch is formed less than five miles north and west of this point by the confluence of several drains, including Killenbeck, Sharps, McDonald, Lamphere, and Loomis. The river has abundant river redhorse and common carp populations, especially by the Geneva Road bridge. The South Branch is fed by Jordan Creek, Lewis Drain, and Spring Creek.

Some of the named tributaries of the main branch include:
Teed Drain
Durbin Drain
Mud Creek
Bluff Creek
Howe Drain
Bliss Drain
Bickerton Drain
High Drain
Howard Creek
Lowe Drain

Note that there are also a Salt Creek and Little Salt Creek in southern Isabella and Midland counties, both of which are tributaries of the Chippewa River.

References

Rivers of Michigan
Rivers of Macomb County, Michigan
Rivers of Midland County, Michigan
Rivers of Isabella County, Michigan